Ernest Hamel (1826-1898) was a French lawyer, poet, historian, journalist and politician. He served as a member of the French Senate from 1892 to 1898, representing Seine-et-Oise.

Early life
Ernest Hamel was born on 2 July 1826 in Paris, France. His great-uncle, Charles François Lhomond, was a grammarian.

Hamel was educated at the Lycée Henri-IV from 1835 to 1845. He studied the Law at the University of Paris from 1845 to 1848.

Career
Hamel published two books about French institutions in 1848-1849. In 1851, he published a collection of poems, Les derniers chants. He subsequently published history books. He also wrote biographies. He served as the president of the Société des Gens de Lettres.

Hamel served as a member of the Francs-tireurs as well as the National Guard during the Franco-Prussian War of 1870-1871. Shortly after the war, Hamel embarked upon a career in journalism, writing for Le Courrier du dimanche, L'Opinion nationale, Le Siècle, La Presse libre, La Réforme, La Revue contemporaine, etc.

Hamel ran for the National Assembly in 1871 and 1876, but he lost both elections. He served as a councillor of the 12th arrondissement of Paris from 1878 to 1887, when he lost the re-election. Meanwhile, he served as the mayor of Richebourg in Yvelines near Paris. Eventually, he served as a member of the French Senate from 1892 to 1898, representing Seine-et-Oise. During his tenure as senator, he debated bills about the Panama Canal and French Algeria.

Personal life, death and legacy

Hamel married Mathilde Huber. They had a son, Edouard Hamel, and a daughter, Louise, who married Paul Maitrot de Varenne. He purchased the Manoir de la Troche in Richebourg from the Dufresne in 1880.

Hamel died on 6 January 1898 in Paris. He was 71 years old. He was buried at the Père Lachaise Cemetery. His son, Edouard Hamel, inherited his manor and served as the mayor of Richebourg.

Works

References

External links

1826 births
1898 deaths
Lawyers from Paris
University of Paris alumni
French military personnel of the Franco-Prussian War
French male poets
19th-century French poets
19th-century French historians
French biographers
Journalists from Paris
Mayors of places in Île-de-France
French Senators of the Third Republic
19th-century French male writers
Senators of Seine-et-Oise
French male non-fiction writers
Male biographers
Councillors of Paris